James or Jim McLaughlin may refer to:

Politics
 James Wellington McLaughlin (1840–1903),  Ontario doctor and political figure
 James McLaughlin (Indian agent) (1842–1923), Indian agent for the U.S. federal government in the Dakotas
 James C. McLaughlin (1858–1932), politician from the U.S. state of Michigan
 James N. McLaughlin (born 1943), member of the Rhode Island House of Representatives

Sports
 J. H. McLaughlin (1844–1905), American wrestler
 Jim McLaughlin (jockey) (1861–1927), American thoroughbred race horse jockey
 Jim McLaughlin (pitcher/outfielder) (1860–1895), baseball player for the 1884 Baltimore Orioles
 Kid McLaughlin (James Anson McLaughlin, 1888–1934), baseball player for the 1914 Cincinnati Reds
 Jim McLaughlin (third baseman) (1902–1968), baseball player for the 1932 St. Louis Browns
 Jim McLaughlin (footballer) (born 1940), footballer and football manager in the League of Ireland
 Jim McLaughlin (coach) (born 1960), American volleyball coach
 James McLaughlin (cyclist) (born 1990), Guernsey road racing cyclist
 Jimmy McLaughlin (born 1993), American soccer player

Other
 James E. McLaughlin (1873–1966), Canadian-American architect
 James W. McLaughlin (1834–1923), American architect
 James McLaughlin (actor), early 20th-century American actor and director

See also
 James McLoughlin (1929–2005), Irish Catholic Bishop
 J. Fairfax McLaughlin (disambiguation)